Charles D. Stewart (1919 – 1986) was an American politician. He served as a Democratic member of the Florida House of Representatives.

In 1955, Stewart was elected to the Florida House of Representatives, succeeding Ferrin C. Campbell. In 1961, he was succeeded by Jack C. Nichols.

References 

1919 births
1986 deaths
Democratic Party members of the Florida House of Representatives
20th-century American politicians